Dean Fourie (born 15 December 1969), is a South African actor. He is best known for the roles in the films Five Fingers for Marseilles, Action Point and Mandela: Long Walk to Freedom.

Career
In 1993, he made the television debut Tropical Heat with a minor role as a 'Guide'. However, he made three more acting appearances in the same year, including the TV movie Daisy de Melker and played a lead role 'Rhodes Cecil Cowle'. In 1996, he made the film debut with the film Rhodes. He played the role 'Lance Corporal', a supportive role. His most notable roles in cinema came through Renegade Cowboy in 2014 and then 2017 blockbuster Five Fingers for Marseilles. He played the role 'Honest John' in latter film which received mostly positive reviews and screened at several international film festivals. It was later screened in the Discovery section at the 2017 Toronto International Film Festival as well.

In 2015, he appeared in the British BBC docudrama The Gamechangers directed by Owen Harris. In the drama, he played the supportive role 'Ray Reiser'.

In later 2018, he played as 'Inspector' in the film Action Point. In 2019, he joined the television documentary Welcome to Murdertown with the supportive role 'Ken Leighty'.

Filmography

See also
 List of South African films

References

External links
 
 Local is LEKKER

Living people
South African male film actors
South African male television actors
1969 births